Bryan Benson was Governor of the Bank of England from 1735 to 1737. He had been Deputy Governor from 1733 to 1735. He replaced Horatio Townshend as Governor and was succeeded by Thomas Cooke.

See also
Chief Cashier of the Bank of England

References

External links

Year of birth missing
Year of death missing
British bankers
Deputy Governors of the Bank of England
Governors of the Bank of England
18th-century English businesspeople